The name Social Democratic Party or Social Democrats has been used by many political parties in various countries around the world. Such parties are most commonly aligned to social democracy as their political ideology.

Active parties

Former parties

See also
Democratic Socialist Party (disambiguation)
List of Labour Parties
Party for Social Democracy
Partido Social Democrata (disambiguation)
Socialist Party (disambiguation)
Socialist International
List of social democratic parties

Lists of political parties